One Sunday Afternoon may refer to:
 One Sunday Afternoon (1933 film), an American pre-Code romantic comedy-drama film
 One Sunday Afternoon (1948 film), a musical film